Gheorghe Caranda (April 21, 1884 – June 20, 1912) was a Romanian army officer and early aviator. He registered at Cotroceni Piloting School founded by George Valentin Bibescu in 1911, and earned his pilot license in 1912.

On June 20, 1912 he crashed his biplane and died on Cotroceni field in Bucharest, thus becoming the first Romanian airplane accident fatality. The Farman III airplane was among those used at Chitila Piloting School, and reportedly had a longitudinal stability problem, and in addition the engine was under-performing on the day of the accident.

Caranda received the Military Virtue Medal posthumously and his name is listed first on the Romanian Airmen Heroes Memorial in Bucharest, before that of aircraft builder and pilot Aurel Vlaicu.

References

External links
 Gheorghe Caranda on earlyaviators.com
 Gheorghe Caranda, the first Romanian aviation hero 

1884 births
1912 deaths
Aviators killed in aviation accidents or incidents in Romania
Military personnel from Iași
Romanian aviators
Victims of aviation accidents or incidents in 1912